The Medicine Lake Wilderness is located in eastern Montana, in the United States. Preserved to ensure migratory birds have a haven during the spring and fall migrations, the wilderness is managed by the U.S. Fish and Wildlife Service and is within Medicine Lake National Wildlife Refuge.

U.S. Wilderness Areas do not allow motorized or mechanized vehicles, including bicycles. Although camping and fishing are allowed with proper permit, no roads or buildings are constructed and there is also no logging or mining, in compliance with the 1964 Wilderness Act. Wilderness areas within National Forests and Bureau of Land Management areas also allow hunting in season. No hunting is permitted in this wilderness.

References

External links
 
 
 

 

IUCN Category Ib
Protected areas of Sheridan County, Montana
Wilderness areas of Montana